In enzymology, a 3-hydroxyanthranilate oxidase (also called 3-HAO) is an enzyme that catalyzes the chemical reaction:

3-hydroxyanthranilate + O2  6-imino-5-oxocyclohexa-1,3-dienecarboxylate + H2O2

Thus, the two substrates of this enzyme are 3-hydroxyanthranilate and O2, whereas its two products are 6-imino-5-oxocyclohexa-1,3-dienecarboxylate and H2O2.

This enzyme belongs to the family of oxidoreductases, specifically those acting on diphenols and related substances as donor with oxygen as acceptor.  The systematic name of this enzyme class is 3-hydroxyanthranilate:oxygen oxidoreductase. This enzyme is also called 3-hydroxyanthranilic acid oxidase.

References

 

EC 1.10.3
Enzymes of unknown structure